The Norinco Type 77 is a Chinese amphibious armoured personnel carrier. First fielded in 1978, it is in many ways similar to the earlier Soviet BTR-50.  However the two vehicles share little in their designs, as the Type 77 is based on the Type 63 light tank.

Variants

Base variants
 Type 77 - Chinese tracked amphibious APC based on the Type 63-I amphibious light tank. The industrial designator is WZ511.
 Type 77-1 - amphibious armoured personnel/artillery carrier designed to carry a disassembled gun (85 mm towed anti-tank gun or 120 mm towed howitzer) on the roof. The vehicle has hydraulic winch and ramps to load/unload the gun. The industrial designator is WZ511-1.
 Type 77-2 - amphibious armoured personnel carrier. No winch and ramps. The industrial designator is WZ511-2.
 Type 76 ARV - recovery vehicle.

Major modifications
 Type 89 self-propelled howitzer (PLZ-89) - Type 77 converted into a self-propelled howitzer armed with 122 mm gun. Although most vehicles were based on Type 77 APCs, some vehicles were based on Type 63-I amphibious light tanks.
 Type 77 Armored Engineering Vehicle - Military engineering vehicle variant featuring two water-jets, excavation crane, and hydraulically-operated dozer in a V-blade configuration.

Operators

References

External links
 http://www.globalsecurity.org/military/world/china/type-77-apc.htm

Amphibious armoured personnel carriers
Armoured fighting vehicles of the People's Republic of China
Armoured personnel carriers of the Cold War
Military vehicles introduced in the 1970s